Wade Eckhart Mainer (April 21, 1907 – September 12, 2011) was an American country singer and banjoist. With his band, the Sons of the Mountaineers, he is credited with bridging the gap between old-time mountain music and Bluegrass and is sometimes called the "Grandfather of Bluegrass". In addition, he innovated a two-finger banjo fingerpicking style, which was a precursor to modern three-finger bluegrass styles.

Originally from North Carolina, Mainer's main influences came from the mountain music of his family. In a career that began in 1934 and spanned almost six decades, Mainer transitioned from being a member of his brother's band into the founder of his own ensemble, the Sons of the Mountaineers, with whom he performed until 1953, when he became more deeply involved with his Christianity and left the music industry. After working at a General Motors factory and attending gospel revivals, Mainer was convinced that he should restart his career as a Christian gospel musician and began to tour with his wife in this capacity. He continued to release albums until 1993.

Personal life 
Mainer was born near Weaverville, North Carolina, on a mountain farm in Buncombe County on April 21, 1907. His family was poor during his childhood and they lived in a log cabin in the Blue Ridge Mountains. Mainer credited his father who was, in Mainer's words, "a good singer – real stout voice", as of one of his influences. During his career as a musical artist, Mainer would perform many of the old songs that he had heard from his father.

Mainer grew up listening to traditional mountain music and was largely influenced by his brother-in-law Roscoe Banks. He first learned to play the banjo at square dances, where he would pick up instruments left by performers and practice on them. After moving to Concord, North Carolina and working in a series of jobs at cotton mills, he became a part of his brother J.E.'s band, known as J. E. Mainer's Mountaineers. His entry into the band in 1934 marked the beginning of a nearly six-decade career in music. J.E. played the fiddle while Wade performed on the banjo for the string band, and they played at fiddlers' conventions and other gatherings.

Mainer married Julia Mae Brown at the end of 1937, shortly after forming his own band. Brown was a singer and guitarist popularly known at the time as Hillbilly Lilly. She had performed from 1935 until 1937 at WSJS Radio in Winston-Salem. Brown is considered to be a pioneering female musical artist and later joined Mainer during his performances.

Musical career 
Mainer's first recordings came in 1934 and are compiled on Ragged But Right: 30's Country Bands. Mainer performed with The Mountaineers on tracks such as "Maple on the Hill", "Seven and a Half" and "Johnson's Old Grey Mule". Also included on the compilation are Mainer's later collaboration "Short Life and It's Trouble" with Zeke Morris, his solo effort "Riding on That Train 45" and a sample song "Mitchell Blues" from his band the Sons of the Mountaineers. Throughout his career, he was noted for his unique and innovative two-finger banjo fingerpicking style, which some view as a precursor to three finger bluegrass banjo styles. Mainer took jobs at local radio stations to increase the visibility of his relative's ensemble, recording classics such as "Take Me in the Lifeboat". During this time, he appeared on many regional stations including WBT in Charlotte, WPTF in Raleigh, WNOX in Knoxville and WPAQ in Mount Airy.

Mainer performed in a series of live radio shows with The Mountaineers, sponsored by Crazy Water Crystals laxatives. In 1934, J.W. Fincher, the head of the company, observed their popularity at the first gig, the Crazy Water Crystal Barn Dance, a radio program out of Charlotte. Under the name J. E. Mainer's Crazy Mountaineers, they toured the American South on live radio shows and recorded fourteen songs for Bluebird Records. "Maple on the Hill", which according to the National Endowment for the Arts was their biggest hit, had originally been composed in the 1890s by Gussie L. Davis.

Mainer was in his brother J.E.'s band for two years, until he left for more traditional work, which at the time was far more profitable than his musical career. Making only five dollars a week under sponsorship, Mainer found that he could earn up to three times as much working at a yarn mill, which he described as being "gold" for the era. After leaving his brother's group in 1936, he began to perform duet work with Zeke Morris, who was a bandmate from The Mountaineers. After a time working on this project, Mainer left to form the short-lived "Smilin' Rangers" which later became "Sons of the Pioneers". Zeke Morris then got together with his brother Wiley to form The Morris Brothers.

Sons of the Mountaineers
Mainer named this new band Sons of the Mountaineers. Its initial lineup included Jay Hugh Hall and Clyde Moody as guitarists with Steve Ledford as a fiddler. Among the musicians who would join the group later were Jack and Curly Shelton, Tiny Dodson, Red Rector and Fred Smith. The band got its start performing on the radio and recording songs for Bluebird Records and their first hit, entitled "Sparkling Blue Eyes" was recorded in 1939. From 1935 through 1941, Mainer recorded over 165 songs for the record label RCA Victor in various lineups, ranking him among the most prolifically recorded country music artists of that period.

The Sons of the Mountaineers briefly stopped playing during World War II because Mainer could not afford to squander the valuable gasoline required for the journey to the radio stations. One notable exception, however, came in 1941, when they were invited to the White House by Eleanor Roosevelt and Alan Lomax. There in Washington D.C., they played several tunes, including "Down in the Willow Garden", a song personally requested by President Franklin Delano Roosevelt. During this time, they also appeared in a version of The Chisholm Trail in New York City. At war's end, the band was reorganized and once again began to play at stations across North Carolina. Recordings at this time were sporadic, due to the declining popularity of the genre. In 1953, after having renewed his commitment to Christianity, Mainer left the group and exited the industry for a time.

Later life 
In 1953, Mainer and his wife settled in Flint, Michigan, where he found work at a General Motors factory. Although renouncing both the music industry and his trademark instrument, the banjo, he and Julia did continue to sing at gospel revival meetings. In the early 1960s, Molly O'Day convinced him that he could use the banjo in gospel recordings, which spurred a series of religiously themed banjo albums beginning in 1961. He also began to record and tour with his wife.

Mainer retired from General Motors in 1973. Mainer has been credited with bridging the gap between old-time mountain music and Bluegrass. Musicians such as Bill Monroe, Ralph Stanley and Doc Watson have all cited Mainer as a source of influence. He has also been called the "Grandfather of Bluegrass". His influence was not limited to the United States. Pete Smith, of the British newspaper The Advertiser, in a report for Mainer's 100th birthday, cited Mainer as "one of the most influential figures in the development of modern bluegrass", noting his picking style and his efforts in bringing bluegrass closer to the mainstream. In addition, Smith also credits him for making the banjo, an instrument previously described as "satanic", acceptable for spiritually-themed music. Mainer continued to live with his wife in Flint, where he celebrated his centenary in 2007 and performed at a concert for his 101st birthday in 2008.

Awards and honors
Mainer is a recipient of a 1987 National Heritage Fellowship awarded by the National Endowment for the Arts, which is the United States government's highest honor in the folk and traditional arts. In 1996 he received the Michigan Heritage Award and the Michigan Country Music Association and Services' Lifetime Achievement Award. In 1998 both he and his wife were inducted into the Michigan Country Music Hall of Fame, while Mainer received North Carolina's Surry Arts Council Lifetime Achievement.

Original discography

Wade Mainer/Zeke Morris

Wade Mainer's Smilin' Rangers

Wade Mainer and his Sons of the Mountaineers

Other discography

Studio albums
 1961: Soulful Sacred Songs
 1971: Sacred Songs of Mother and Home
 1973: The Songs of Wade Mainer
 1976: From the Maple to the Hill
 1980: Old Time Songs
 1984: Old Time Banjo Tunes
 1987: In the Land of Melody
 1989: How Sweet to Walk
 1990: String Band Music
 1993: Old Time Gospel Favorites
 1993: Carolina Mule

Compilation albums
 1979: Early Radio
 1983: Early and Great, Volume 1
 ????: Early and Great, Volume 2
 1993: Early and Great, Volume 3

References

External links
 
 
 Wade Mainer recordings at the Discography of American Historical Recordings.

1907 births
2011 deaths
Bluegrass musicians from North Carolina
American country singer-songwriters
American centenarians
Men centenarians
King Records artists
Musicians from Flint, Michigan
Old-time musicians
People from Weaverville, North Carolina
Singer-songwriters from North Carolina
Singer-songwriters from Michigan
National Heritage Fellowship winners
20th-century American musicians
American banjoists
Country musicians from North Carolina
Country musicians from Michigan